Maximilian Herbert Gottlieb Schultz, known professionally as Mikhail Fedorovich was a vice admiral of the Imperial Russian Navy, he was distinguished for his service in the Boxer Rebellion, Russo-Japanese War and World War I.

Biography
Born on January 6, 1862, in Kronstadt, in the family of naval officer; Fyodor Bogdanovich von Schultz and his wife Emilia ur. von Voigt (German: Emilie Henriette v. Voigt) (16.01.1832 - 15.05.1889). After the family moved to St. Petersburg, Maximilian was assigned to the Annenschule, after graduating from it on September 16, 1875, he entered the Naval School (Naval Cadet Corps). He was released as a midshipman into the 3rd naval crew on April 12, 1881, but on August 29 he was transferred to the Separate Border Guard Corps. M. Schultz was assigned to the border cruiser "Dive", on which during the year, sailing in the Baltic Sea, first as a midshipman, and from May 31, 1882, with the rank of warrant officer, he hunted for smugglers.

May 21, 1883, MF Schultz was returned to the Naval Department with the appointment of an officer of the watch on the corvette "Bayan", which was going on a foreign voyage. This trip to the Pacific Ocean lasted almost two years. Soon after his return, on August 27, 1885, Mikhail Fedorovich was appointed to the position of inspector of the two-turret armored boat of the defense of the Kronstadt port "Smerch". In 1886, he attended a short course in the Mine Officer Class and was awarded the rank of a Mine Officer of the 2nd category on December 16, 1886, in the exam. Following this, M.F.Schultz continued to serve on the armored boat "Smerch", where on January 1, 1889learned about the assignment of the rank of lieutenant. 5 months later, on May 2, 1889, he was appointed commander of the third company of the battleship "Petr Veliky".

Until autumn, M.F. Schultz was sailing in the Baltic Sea as part of the Practical Squadron under the command of Vice Admiral N.V. Kopytov, after which he was enrolled in the Kronstadt diving school, where he studied with a break for overseas navigation on the armored frigate "Minin" Under the command of Captain 1st Rank A. A. Birilyov. It began on September 3 and lasted for almost a year. In the fall of 1891, M.F. Schultz returned to the Diving School, which he successfully completed at the end of December with the title of Diving Officer. By the way, during the years of study, MF Schultz managed to design an underwater mine detector, which was soon adopted for service, and also significantly improved the underwater telephone.

For several years MF Schultz was a teacher, then the head of the Diving School in Kronstadt. In 1891 his namesake Max Konstantinovich von Schultz graduated from this school. Immediately after graduating from school, M.K. Schultz was left as a teacher. In 1896, he took the position of assistant head of the school, and since 1906, for 11 years, he headed it. In modern historical literature, Max Konstantinovich is often called as the head of the school, and during the period when it was actually headed by Mikhail Fedorovich.

In his new capacity as a diving officer, MF Schultz continued to serve on the frigate Minin, but on August 31, 1892, he again ended up at the Diving School, but as a teacher. In 1894, in a group of teachers and cadets of the Diving School, he took part in a vain search for the battleship Rusalka, which had sunk a year earlier during the passage from Reval to Helsingfors, and in the summer of the next year, with a group of Baltic divers, he went in search of the English frigate Prince, which with a cargo gold sank in the Balaklava area back in 1854.

At this, MF Schultz's service in the Baltic was interrupted for a long time and on October 16, 1895, he was sent to the disposal of the Siberian naval crew, where on March 10, that is, by the beginning of the 1896 campaign, he was assigned to the destroyer Revel. Almost simultaneously, MF Schultz became a member of the temporary naval court of the Vladivostok port.

In conditions of personnel shortage of the command personnel, the officers were forced to constantly move between the crews of the ships. This also affected MF Schultz. So, on October 16, 1896, he was appointed as the chief of the mine transport "Aleut", and on November 18, he was already the commander of the 11th company of the Siberian naval crew. The following year on 1897, on April 18, just before the start of the campaign, MF Schultz was appointed commander of the Sveaborg destroyer, in order to transfer Borgo as the commander of the Borgo destroyer on May 30. In the fall, with the end of the 1897 campaign, he was already the commander of the third company of the gunboat "Manjur", from where on August 5, 1898, was temporarily transferred as a senior officer of the cruiser "Bully". Then, in November, M.F. Schultz was again the commander, however, already of the 12th company of the naval crew.

At the beginning of 1899, M.F. Schultz was transferred from Vladivostok to the ice-free Port Arthur , where on January 11 he took over as the commander of the destroyer detachment No.'s 203, 204, 205, 206, 207. The next appointment as a senior officer of the gunboat "Beaver" followed before most of 1900, but M.F. Schultz practically did not have to serve her. Already in early January, he urgently left for the Baltic, where, together with his younger brother, he took part in the rescue of the coastal defense battleship " General-Admiral Apraksin ", which ran into stones near the island of Gogland. For the first time in the practice of underwater work by M.F.Shultz and A.K. Nebolsinwere carried out underwater blasting operations aimed at destroying the rock under the bottom of the battleship.

MF Schultz returned from a business trip in the middle of spring 1900 and already on April 27 received an appointment as a senior officer of the cruiser "Robber", where his younger brother had recently served. As part of the Eight Nation Alliance, M.F. Schultz had to take part in military events in China. He led one of the paratroopers that took part in the storming of the Taku Fortress and in the campaign against Beijing. His service on the "Rogue" continued for almost two more years. Aboard the cruiser on April 14, 1902, M.F. Schultz received the news that he had been awarded the rank of captain of the 2nd rank, and less than a month later he was appointed commander of the "Piercing" destroyer. This meant that he had to return to the Baltic, however, in the fall of 1902 M.F. Schultz found himself in Port Arthur as the commander of the Brave destroyer, which had just entered service . Most likely, Mikhail Fedorovich never made it to St. Petersburg, because, as it turned out, in the summer he was testing his future ship in Port Arthur.

Russian-Japanese War. Commander of the legendary cruiser Novik

The destroyer "Brave" turned out to be the very ship on which M.F. Schultz met the beginning of the Russo-Japanese War. Immediately after the outbreak of hostilities, "Brave" was in the thick of things. So, already on the second day of the war, only two destroyers - "Guarding" , which became legendary after its destruction, and its partner, "Brave", combined forces and very successfully guarded the approaches to the fortress from the sea.

On February 24, Vice Admiral Stepan Makarov took over as commander of the Pacific Squadron, and on March 16, 1904, Captain 2nd Rank M.F. Schultz was appointed commander of the Novik cruiser. M.F. Schultz received the legendary ship from Captain I-st Rank N.O. Essen , whom Stepan Makarov transferred to the commander of the battleship "Sevastopol". Initially, Makarov's decision was not approved by Nicholas II in the Far East and Admiral Yevgeni Ivanovich Alekseyev so for a while and N.O. Essen and M.F. Schulz number of time to perform their duties.

In Port Arthur, "Novik" was the only ship constantly in a state of 40-minute readiness. This meant that most of his cars were always under steam. "Novik" participated in almost all operations of the squadron, often acted alone or led a detachment of destroyers. The head of the watch, A.P. Shter, wrote in detail about the service at Novik. The Novik team was perhaps the most decorated in Port Arthur. M.F. Schultz was awarded the Golden Weapon for Bravery. The following report by MF Shultz testifies to the daily work of Novik:

It was from the side of his "Novik" on March 31, 1904, that M.F. Shultz watched the sinking of the battleship "Petropavlovsk" with the squadron commander S.O. Makarov and all of its headquarters on board. The tragedy common to all the defenders of Port Arthur had a deeply personal connotation for him, because next to S.O. Makarov was his brother Konstantin.

Very quickly the fame of "Novik" spread far beyond Port Arthur. Even the Japanese admired the exploits of the cruiser, seriously believing that he was "bewitched" from defeats. The Tokyo correspondent for the London Times wrote:

In 1904, in the besieged Port Arthur, MF Schultz was the only ship commander who organized his own subsidiary farm. Some ground commanders did this, but not naval ones. AP Shter wrote about this in detail: 

Since the winter of 1904, Novik has become, perhaps, the most frequent and most popular war hero in the foreign press. The key event in the actions of the Pacific Squadron was the failed breakthrough from Port Arthur to Vladivostok on July 28, 1904. Only a few warships managed to break through the squadron of Admiral Tōgō Heihachirō, but all of them soon found themselves interned in the nearest neutral ports. The only exception was Novik. Having replenished the supply of coal in the port of Qingdao, he made an attempt to reach Vladivostok alone, bypassing Japan from the east. The maneuver was almost a success. The cruiser reached the Russian shores of Sakhalin Island in 10 days, where he was forced to take an unequal battle with the Japanese cruiser Tsushima. As a result of the battle, both of its participants were seriously damaged, but Novik could no longer move on and M.F. Shultz made the decision to sink the cruiser at the Korsakov post, having previously brought the team ashore. About the circumstances of the breakthrough and the last battle of "Novik" MF Schultz compiled the most submissive report. In Russia, the death of the legendary cruiser was perceived with great pain. In those days, the journal Chronicle of the War with Japan, in hot pursuit, published an article entitled “In Memory of Novik”. It contains the following words:

As Boris Galenin notes

M. F Schultz himself for this breakthrough was awarded the Order of St. George, 4th class.

Arriving in Vladivostok on August 9, 1904, three days later, M.F. Schultz was appointed temporarily to serve as the commander of the 1st rank cruiser of the Vladivostok squad of cruisers "Thunderbolt", thereby replacing the captain of the 1st rank who was seriously wounded in the battle on August 1 in the Korea Strait N. D. Dabicha. It was assumed that the new commander of the "Thunderbolt", Captain 1st Rank Lev Alekseevich Brusilov would arrive in Vladivostok by the end of December, but he arrived only in April 1905. For this reason, M.F. Shultz was acting as the commander of the "Thunderbolt" and participating in all the hostilities of the Vladivostok cruiser detachment, from December 31, 1904, M.F. Shultz also headed the Siberian naval crew.

In Vladivostok, M.F. Schultz was closely acquainted with the outstanding Russian traveler, geographer, ethnographer and writer, the future author of the famous novels “Across the Ussuriysk Territory” and “Dersu Uzala” Vladimir Arsenyev. Together they were engaged in archaeological research. The Grodekov Museum in Khabarovsk still houses the finds made in the fall of 1916 by V. K. Arseniev, M. F. Shultz and the commander of the auxiliary cruiser "Orel" A. N. Pell on the Sandy Peninsula in the Amur Bay... The fact that they had discovered the most ancient Paleolithic site was evidenced by stone spearheads, stone axes and chips. It is interesting that pottery of a later period was also nearby. The importance of the finds was assessed later. In Soviet times, after World War II, the Peschaniy Peninsula was excavated by Academician of the USSR Academy of Sciences, Alexey Okladnikov.

In modern historical literature, two high-profile trials of 1906 - 1908 are often associated with the name of M.F.Schultz. The first of them established the reasons for the death of the 2nd Pacific squadron of Zinovy Rozhdestvensky in the Battle of Tsushima, and in the second in the surrender of the fortress of Port Arthur. In the process dedicated to the Tsushima tragedy, Captain 2nd Rank von Schultz appeared as the prosecutor of admirals Zinovy Rozhestvensky and Nikolai Nebogatov. In the case of the surrender of Port Arthur, he acted as a defender of the former commandant of the fortress, General Konstantin Smirnov. In fact, by the time these trials began, M.F. Schultz was already a captain of the 1st rank, and served on the Black Sea, and the participant in the proceedings, obviously, was captain 2nd rank Gustav Konstantinovich von Schultz.

Between the Two Wars

With the end of the war with Japan, on September 26, 1905, M.F. Schultz surrendered the Siberian crew and left for St. Petersburg. It was assumed that his further place of service would be the Baltic Fleet, but after the 1905 Russian Revolution on the cruiser Ochakov , officers began to rotate, and Mikhail Fedorovich on January 30 was urgently transferred to the Black Sea Fleet as the commander of the cruiser Cahul , which had just entered service. M.F. Schultz received it at the walls of the shipyard in Nikolaev and went to Sevastopol to conduct sea trials. On January 31, 1907, the cruiser was enlisted in the ships of the Separate Practical Detachment of the Black Sea, and on March 25, it was renamed the cruiser "Memory of Mercury". On the same days, on April 27, 1907, Mikhail Fedorovich became captain of the 1st rank.

M.F. Schultz was also a passionate photographer and captured the entire Port Arthur epic in his photographs. After the end of the Russo-Japanese War, in collaboration with Lieutenant B.V. Zhdanov in 1906 in the publishing house of Prokudin-Gorsky, he released “Port Arthur Album. 1904-05". A huge collection of photographic plates depicting the Russo-Japanese War, which occupied a whole chest, accompanied him all his life. In 1919, in Luga, during the arrest of M.F.Schultz by the Chekists, this chest was confiscated and disappeared for many years. In 1951, a significant part of the negatives was accidentally discovered during the renovation of a house in Vitebsk and entered the funds of the Central Naval Museum. In fact, the authorship of so many unnamed photographs of the Russo-Japanese War distributed on the Internet belonged to M.F. Schultz.

In the few years that MF Schultz served on the Black Sea, he was among the founders and was elected vice-commander of the Sevastopol Yacht Club.

Exactly one year later, on March 3, 1908, MF Schultz was appointed commander of the battleship " John Chrysostom", which actually ended his service on the Black Sea. During these years, M.F. Schultz combined his service as a ship commander with activities of a different kind. After the naval court pronounced the death sentence on the initiator of the uprising on the cruiser "Ochakov", retired lieutenant of the fleet Pyotr Schmidt, there was a real threat of reprisals against the members of the court from the Socialist-Revolutionary Party. In connection with the decision to change the composition of the naval court of the Sevastopol port on March 28, 1907, M.F. Schultz was appointed a member.

On November 24, 1908, N.O. Essen became the commander of the United detachments as the chief of the Baltic Sea Naval Forces . Before taking office, he received the right to select officers for key posts. One of the first on his list for Captain 1st Rank was M.F. Schultz. N.O. Essen planned to use him as the commander of a detachment of minelayers, which still had to be formed. For this reason, MF Schultz conducted the first campaign in the Baltic as a commander with a training clipper "Cruiser" and only on November 10, 1910, after completing tests of all the minelayers of the detachment, and there were six of them, he took command of this formation under a braid pennant.

For three years of commanding the newly created detachment of minelayers, MF Schultz made it one of the most efficient formations of the fleet. The detachment first mastered skerry fairways, the sailors perfectly mastered the technique of solving combat missions of any complexity. Twice (06/29/1910 and 03/21/1911) the detachment was honored with the attention of Nicholas II. According to the results of these reviews, M.F. Schultz was awarded the Highest gratitude, and on December 6, 1911, he was promoted to rear admiral. After two and a half years, it is this force (already under the command of another chief - Rear Admiral VA Kanin ), a few hours before the start of the First World War, brilliantly set minefields on the Gran Porkkala Udd, reliably blocking the Gulf of Finland and thus secured Petrograd as he penetrated the enemy landing.

On April 3, 1913, leaving a detachment of minelayers, MF Schultz took command of a brigade of cruisers consisting of the armored cruiser "Thunderbolt" of the cruisers "Admiral Makarov", "Pallada" and the destroyer that inherited the name of his legendary "Novik". MF Schultz had only one campaign to command him, and on November 4, 1913, he was appointed commander of the Siberian military flotilla .

World War I
On the eve of the First World War, the Siberian Flotilla did not represent a significant naval force. It consisted of the cruisers Askold and Zhemchug, the gunboat Manjur, 9 destroyers, 10 destroyers and 9 submarines, so its tasks were relatively modest. Literally on the eve of the war, M. F. Schultz outfitted and escorted to the far Arctic voyage fourth and most successful expedition under the command BA Vilkitsky . Then the two famous icebreakers "Taimyr" and "Vaygach" for the first time managed to pass the Northern Sea Route and reach Arkhangelsk.

With the beginning of the war, the Siberian Flotilla, already very modest in its strength, was forced to transfer to the British squadron for joint operations against the squadron of Vice Admiral M. von Spee two of its most efficient ships - the cruisers Askold and Zhemchug. In order to strengthen its flotilla, a number of Volunteer Fleet ships had to be mobilized and converted into warships. A small squadron commanded by M.F. Schultz successfully coped with the task of escorting and receiving in Vladivostok the flow of ships arriving with military cargoes to Russia from America. During the entire war, only once, and in the very first days of the war, the German cruiser Emden managed to detain the Russian steamer Ryazan.

With the organization of the Arctic Ocean Flotilla in the north of Russia, M.F. Schultz was ordered to transfer a number of his warships to it, as well as to organize the acceptance, repair and transfer to the north of three former Russian warships bought from Japan. These were the battleships "Poltava" (which was renamed "Chesma"), and "Peresvet", as well as the cruiser "Varyag".

On October 18, 1916, many residents of Primorye observed a meteorite falling. The heavenly body fell in broad daylight one hundred and eighty kilometers north of Vladivostok, near the settlement of Boguslavka. M.F. Schultz took part in organizing the search for the meteorite. Two large fragments of a meteorite with a total mass of 256.8 kg were found. After retirement, Mikhail Fedorovich personally transported him to Petrograd. The meteorite "Boguslavka" is now stored in the Meteorite collection of the Russian Academy of Sciences and registered under the name of Vice-Admiral M.F. von Schultz. "Boguslavka" is extremely rare - an iron meteorite. He is the first of the similar ones found on the territory of Russia. Thanks to this find, the name of M.F.Schultz was entered on the Board of Honor of the Meteorite Collection of the Russian Academy of Sciences.

After the February Revolution, as he refused to swear allegiance to the Provisional Government on April 4, 1917, M.F. He returned to Petrograd, and, according to the recollections of his nephew B.L. Kerber, all the way through the camp, engulfed in revolutionary and Germanophobic sentiments, he was accompanied and guarded on his own initiative by the seamen of the Siberian Flotilla who had been transferred to the reserve.

When the Bolsheviks came to power, M.F.Schultz did not take part in the Russian Civil War and lived in the suburbs of the capital. Having never had a family, he settled with his sister in the district town of Luga. In the summer of 1919, Nikolai Yudenich's army approached Luga. On the initiative of the latter, a secret meeting of a representative of his staff with a retired admiral was organized. M.F. Schultz confirmed his intention not to participate in the war, but it was likely that this meeting became known to the Reds. Soon he was arrested and shot by the Chekists. This happened in late September or early October 1919. The burial place of Vice Admiral M.F. Schultz remained hidden.

Family
MF Schultz did not have his own family.

Brother: Wilhelm Fedorovich von Schultz - 2nd rank captain;
Brother: Konstantin Fedorovich von Schultz - Captain 2nd Rank;
Sister: Olga Fedorovna Kerber - wife of Vice Admiral Ludwig Berngardovich von Kerber ;
Sister: Clara Fedorovna Garf - wife of Lieutenant General Yevgeny Georgievich von Garf ;
Cousin: Ewald Karlovich von Schultz - Captain 1st Rank.

References

Bibliography
 Kopytov G.A. Kerbers. Family code. XIV-XXI centuries  - Book. 1. - Ed. Petersburg - XXI century, 2013.
 (Mikhail Fedorovich Schultz part 1) 
 (Mikhail Fedorovich Schultz part 2) 
 Board of Honor of the RAS Meteorite Collection
  Egor Bratsun  2nd rank cruiser Novik
 '' Shter A.P. A. P. Shter. - SPb .: Sev. print, 1908. - V, III, 87 p. (stereotypical edition: St. Petersburg: Gangut, 2001).
 

1862 births
1919 deaths
Imperial Russian Navy admirals
Russian military personnel of the Russo-Japanese War
Military personnel from Saint Petersburg
People from Kronstadt
Recipients of the Order of St. Vladimir, 3rd class
Recipients of the Order of St. Anna, 1st class
Recipients of the Order of St. Anna, 2nd class
Recipients of the Order of St. Anna, 3rd class
Recipients of the Order of Saint Stanislaus (Russian), 1st class
Recipients of the Order of Saint Stanislaus (Russian), 2nd class
Recipients of the Order of Saint Stanislaus (Russian), 3rd class
Recipients of the Order of the Sacred Treasure
Naval Cadet Corps alumni